The Confederation of European Environmental Engineering Societies (CEEES) was created as a co-operative international organization for information exchange regarding environmental engineering between the various European societies in this field.

The CEEES maintains an online public discussion forum for the interchange of information.

The member societies of the CEEES

As of 2012, these were the twelve member societies of the CEEES:

Italy: Associazione Italia Tecnici Prove Ambientali (AITPA)
France: Association pour le Développement des Sciences et Techniques de l'Environnement (ASTE)
Belgium: Belgian Society of Mechanical and Environmental Engineering (BSMEE)
Germany: Gesellschaft für Umweltsimulation (GUS)
Finland: Finnish Society of Environmental Engineering (KOTEL)
Czech Republic: National Association of Czech Environmental Engineers (NACEI)
Austria: Österreichische Gesellschaft für Umweltsimulation (ÖGUS)
Netherlands: PLatform Omgevings Technologie (PLOT)
United Kingdom: Society of Environmental Engineers (SEE)
Sweden: Swedish Environmental Engineering Society (SEES)
Portugal: Sociedade Portuguesa de Simulacao Ambiental e Aveliaca de Riscos (SOPSAR)
Switzerland: Swiss Society for Environmental Engineering (SSEE)

Each member society successively holds the presidency and the secretariat for a period of two years.

Technical Advisory Boards

The CEEES has three major Technical Advisory Boards:

Mechanical Environments: The aim of this board is to advance methodologies and technologies for quantifying, describing and simulating mechanical environmental conditions experienced by mechanical equipment during its useful life.
Climatic and Atmospheric Pollution Effects: The aim of this board is the study of the climatic and atmospheric pollution effects on  materials and mechanical equipment.
Reliability and Environmental Stress Screening: The aim of this board is the study how the environmental effects the reliability of equipment.

Publications

These are some of the publications of the CEEES:

 A Bibliography on Transportation Environment, ISSN 1104-6341, published by the Swedish Packaging Research Institute (Packforsk) in 1994.
 Synthesis of an ESS-Survey at the European Level, ISSN 1104-6341, published by the Swiss Society for Environmental Engineering (SSEE) in 1998.
 List of Technical Documents Dedicated or Related to ESS, published by the Swiss Society for Environmental Engineering (SSEE) in 1998.
 Climatic and Air Pollution Effects on Material and Equipment,ISBN No. 978-3-9806167-2-0, published by Gesellschaft für Umweltsimulation (GUS) in 1999.
 Natural and Artificial Ageing of Polymers, 1st European Weathering Symposium, Prague. , published by Gesellschaft für Umweltsimulation (GUS) in 2004
 Natural and Artificial Ageing of Polymers, 2nd European Weathering Symposium, Gothenburg. , published by Gesellschaft für Umweltsimulation (GUS) in 2005
 Ultrafine Particles – Key in the Issue of Particulate Matter?, 18th European Federation of Clean Air (EFCA) International Symposium, published by the Karlsruhe Research Center (Forschungszentrum Karlsruhe FZK) in 2007.
 Natural and Artificial Ageing of Polymers, 3rd European Weathering Symposium, Kraków. ISBN No. 978-3-9810472-3-3, published by GUS in 2005.
 Reliability - For A Mature Product From The Beginning Of Useful Life. The Different Type Of Tests And Their Impact On Product Reliability. ISSN 1104-6341, published online by CEEES in 2009.

See also

European Environment Agency
Environment Agency
Ministry of Housing, Spatial Planning and the Environment (Netherlands)
Environmental technology
Environmental science
Coordination of Information on the Environment

External links
Official website
ASTE website
BSMEE website
CEEES website.
GUS website
KOTEL website
ÖGUS website
PLOT website
SEE website
SEES website
SOPSAR website
SSEE website

References

International environmental organizations
Environmental engineering
Pan-European trade and professional organizations